Marie François Rouyer (2 March 1765 – 10 August 1824) was a French general during the Napoleonic Wars.

Biography
In 1783 he joined the Imperial Army of the Holy Roman Empire and became a lieutenant of dragoons within three years. He served in Transylvania and against the Ottomans but resigned and returned to France during the French Revolution. In 1791 he joined the French army as an infantry captain. He fought in the French Revolutionary Wars, becoming an Adjutant General Chef de brigade (colonel) on 12 April 1794. He won promotion to general of brigade on 30 July 1799. Napoleon Bonaparte named him a commander of the Légion d'Honneur on 14 June 1804.

Assigned to lead a brigade in the VI Corps, he fought at Haslach-Jungingen and Dürrenstein in the War of the Third Coalition. He earned advancement to general of division on 24 December 1805 but continued to lead a brigade. The following year he fought at Halle, Waren-Nossentin, and Lübeck. In the last action he captured Carl Carlsson Mörner and 600 Swedes. In 1807, he served at Mohrungen and Braunsberg before being given command of a Hessian division. He then led, for some time, the forces besieging Graudenz.

He became a Baron of the Empire on 18 March 1809. In the War of the Fifth Coalition his division of French-allied Germans guarded Napoleon's line of communications. His forces were mauled at Franzensfeste on 4 August 1809 while attempting to suppress the Tyrolean Rebellion. In early 1810 he led a division in Catalonia. In 1813 and 1814, he commanded the 2nd Division in Italy at Caldiero and the Mincio. King Louis XVIII of France appointed him a chevalier of the Order of Saint Louis. He was buried at Barville, Vosges on 10 August 1824.  ROUYER is one of the names inscribed under the Arc de Triomphe, on Column 1.

References

 Broughton, Tony. napoleon-series.org Generals Who Served in the French Army during the Period 1789-1815 (accessed 24 September 2011)

Generals of the First French Empire
French Republican military leaders of the French Revolutionary Wars
French commanders of the Napoleonic Wars
People from Lorraine
Knights of the Order of Saint Louis
1765 births
1824 deaths
Names inscribed under the Arc de Triomphe
Burials at Père Lachaise Cemetery
Military personnel of the Holy Roman Empire